Springpfuhl is a railway station in the Marzahn district of Berlin.

The station opened on December 30, 1976, at the railway line to Wriezen built in 1898.

References

Railway stations in Berlin
Buildings and structures in Marzahn-Hellersdorf
Railway stations in Germany opened in 1976
1976 establishments in East Germany
Berlin S-Bahn stations